The Campaign to Suppress Bandits in Northwestern China was a counter-guerrilla/counter-insurgency campaign the People's Liberation Army (PLA) fought against the Nationalist guerrilla force let in Mainland China.

The Nationalist forces mainly consisted of irregular forces and Nationalist Revolutionary Army troops left behind after the nationalist government fled to Taiwan.  The campaign was fought in the northwestern China, and resulted in victory for the People's Republic of China.

Strategies

Nationalist miscalculations
When the Nationalists left mainland China, they enlisted the assistance of local forces to fight the PLA.  According to Chinese historians, a large segment of these forces were actually bandits.  The Nationalist government felt that if the bandits succeed in weakening the  PLA, it would help the nationalists counterattack from Taiwan to retake China.  The local population feared and hated these men for their depredations.  As a result, it pushed more people to support the PLA.

A second miscalculation was in accepting assistance from warlords.  After collaborating with the Japanese Imperial Army during the Japanese Occupation of China, these men had surrendered to the Nationalist camp.  The presence of warlords served to alienate other Nationalist factions who resented their collaboration with the Japanese and doubted their willingness to fight.   However, the Nationalists had no real choice but to enlist the warlords in the war effort. As with the bandits, the warlords had little popular support.

The third miscalculation was the Nationalists evacuating their best army units to Taiwan.   The troops left behind were the less disciplined second rate and undisciplined third rate troops, both of which mostly consisted of warlords' troops. These troops had no training and little motivation to fight an insurrection.  Compounding the problem, due to the need of bandits' knowledge of local area, they were often rewarded with higher ranks than the Nationalist troops.  As a result, the Nationalist troops lacked any willingness to work with the bandits they once attempted to exterminate,  Similarly, the bandits lacked the similar willingness and were willing to betray Nationalist troops.

The fourth strategic miscalculation was a lack of financial support by the Nationalist government.  The government provided arms and little else.  That provided an added incentive for the bandits and other forces to steal supplies and money from the local population, further increasing their anger. The lack of money also eroded support for the Nationalists from their allies, the wealthy landowners and businessmen.  This group had little interest in working with bandits who had robbed and killed within their group for generation.

The final miscalculation was over the inability to agree on a war strategy among the coalition.   The military men wanted to fight a total war against the enemy that involved destroying supplies, infrastructure and production capabilities.  In contrast, the landowners/businessmen and the bandits did not want to cause the destruction of valuable property. They believed that it was possible to defeat the PLA without these measures in a few years, allowing them to reclaim assets that the People's Republic had seized. This basic disagreement over strategy weakened the Nationalist coalition.

PLA strategies
According to Chinese historians, the PLA strategy was to mobilize the entire population to fight the Nationalist coalition.  Additional strategies were devised specifically to fit the local situation.

Order of battle
Nationalists: over 90,000, including nearly 20,000 regular troops of Ma clique.
Ma Bufang's troops left behind
Ma Hongkui's troops left behind
Other bandits in over 100 different bands

PLA: a quarter million troop in 38 divisions, including:
1st Army
2nd Army
3rd Army
4th Army
5th Army
6th Army
19th Army
5 other armies
Independent regiments

Campaign
After dozens of battles occurred from October to December 1949, the Nationalists were driven to the remote regions of China.  As a result, they adopted more guerrilla tactics.   There were a total of 67 bandit groups in Gansu, over 40 bands in Shaanxi, and several bands in Xinjiang.  In Qinghai, more nationalist regular troops existed,  soldiers of Ma clique.  In November 1949, the PLA launched a campaign to eradicate bandits completely.

From January 1950 to July 1950, attacks on the bandits were carried out by the northwestern military region on multiple fronts.  From the beginning of January to the end of February, the 55th Division of the PLA 19th Army, the Ankang Independent Regiment of Shaanxi Military Region, and troops of Hanzhong Military Sub-region defeated the bandits headed by Wang Lingyun (王凌云) in southern Shaanxi.

From mid January to mid March 1950, the 1st Division of the PLA 1st Army, the 11th and 12th Division of its 2nd Army, troops of Shaanxi Yulin Military Sub-region, and the 5th Cavalry Division defeated bands of bandits, including those headed by Gao Huaixiong (高怀雄) and Zhang Tingzhi (张廷芝) in northern Shaanxi, bandits headed by Ma Yinggui (马英贵) and Ma Zhengzhong (马镇中) in Gansu, bandits headed by Ma Xiancheng (马成贤) and Mao Laowu (马老五) in Qinghai, and bandits headed by Ma Shaowu (马绍武) in Ningxia.

From mid April to the end of July 1950, the PLA 2nd, 5th and 6th Armies drove into Xinjiang, destroying bandit bases in the region of the Greater and Lesser Salt Cedar Valleys (大小红柳峡) and Black Mountain (黑山头).  From May to July, The PLA destroyed the bandits headed by Ma Yuanshan (马元山) and Ma Baoyuan (马保元) in Ningxia, Qinghai, and Gansu.  In May 1950, the communists changed tactics by assigning selected regions to particular military formations for bandit eradication and by the end of July 1950, over seventy thousand bandits had been killed.

From August 1950 to the end of 1952, further operations were launched against smaller bands of bandits which totaled over 10,000 in 212 bands.  Most of these bandits operated in the border regions of provinces.  During the Korean War, these bandits became more active supposedly under the commands of airdropped Nationalist agents.

From August 1950, the PLA 6th Cavalry Division, 7th Infantry Division, and troops from the Pingliang and Qingyang Military Sub-Districts totaling more than 15,000 begun their operation against the more than a dozen bands of bandits headed by chieftains including Guo Shuanzi (郭栓子), Ma Yanbiao (马彦彪), Ma Guoyuan (马国援) and others in Xiji (西吉), Longde (隆德), Helan Mountains and Hexi Corridor regions.  After one year and eight months, the 2,000 bandits in the regions were killed.

From late January 1951 to March 1951, cavalry regiments and camel cavalry regiments of the PLA 1st Army, 2nd Army, 3rd Army and 4th Army led by Huang Xinting (黄新廷), augmented by the 27th Infantry Regiment, defeated bandits headed by Uzman and Hussein in Chaidamu Basin (柴达木盆地).  In May 1952, the PLA 1st Army augmented by 8 regiments of the Qinghai Military District defeated bandits headed by Xiang Qian (项谦) in Guideangla (贵德昂拉) region of Qinghai after a 17-day long operation.  During this stage, nearly 10,000 bandits surrendered and over 5,800 were killed.

In December 1952, there was a conference on further deployment of PLA troops in Northwestern Military Region to completely eradicate the Nationalist guerrilla / insurgents in the region.  A  total of 126 companies totaling more than 19,000 soldiers were deployed.  Five regiments and a battalion of Southwestern Military Region was also mobilized to support the effort, which was completed successfully with killing 1,600 bandits headed by Ma Liang (马良) and Ma Yuaxiang (马元祥) in the border region of Qinghai, Sichuan, and Gansu.  Meanwhile, over 3,700 bandits in Xinjiang were also annihilated.

Conclusion
By July 1953, the campaign ended in PLA victory.  Over 90,900 Nationalist guerrilla /insurgents had been killed, captured or surrendered.  In addition, the PLAalso captured over 80 artillery pieces and over 35,000 firearms.

Outcome
Although sharing a common anticommunist goal, Nationalist guerrilla and insurgency warfare was largely handicapped by the enlistment of bandits, many of whom had previously fought and killed Nationalist troops, and also attacked and robbed landlords and business owners, an important faction that supported the Nationalist government and who were now forced into an alliance of convenience with the bandits. Differences within the ranks of the Nationalist guerillas themselves compounded these issues.

Another important contributor to the Nationalist failure was the lack of a unified command.  Although the Nationalists were under the command of the Nationalist government in Taiwan, the troops only took orders from their old masters, the Ma clique.  With the command thousands miles away, there was not any effective control and orders were often ignored.  The distant headquarters also meant that there was a lack of current intelligence and situational awareness  and thus even if Nationalist command could exercise effective control, they were unable to craft battleplans reflecting the changing reality on the ground.

See also
List of battles of the Chinese Civil War
National Revolutionary Army
History of the People's Liberation Army
Chinese Civil War

References
Zhu, Zongzhen and Wang, Chaoguang, Liberation War History, 1st Edition, Social Scientific Literary Publishing House in Beijing, 2000,  (set)
Zhang, Ping, History of the Liberation War, 1st Edition, Chinese Youth Publishing House in Beijing, 1987,  (pbk.)
Jie, Lifu, Records of the Liberation War: The Decisive Battle of Two Kinds of Fates, 1st Edition, Hebei People's Publishing House in Shijiazhuang, 1990,  (set)
Literary and Historical Research Committee of the Anhui Committee of the Chinese People's Political Consultative Conference, Liberation War, 1st Edition, Anhui People's Publishing House in Hefei, 1987, 
Li, Zuomin, Heroic Division and Iron Horse: Records of the Liberation War, 1st Edition, Chinese Communist Party History Publishing House in Beijing, 2004, 
Wang, Xingsheng, and Zhang, Jingshan, Chinese Liberation War, 1st Edition, People's Liberation Army Literature and Art Publishing House in Beijing, 2001,  (set)
Huang, Youlan, History of the Chinese People's Liberation War, 1st Edition, Archives Publishing House in Beijing, 1992, 
Liu Wusheng, From Yan'an to Beijing: A Collection of Military Records and Research Publications of Important Campaigns in the Liberation War, 1st Edition, Central Literary Publishing House in Beijing, 1993, 
Tang, Yilu and Bi, Jianzhong, History of Chinese People's Liberation Army in Chinese Liberation War, 1st Edition, Military Scientific Publishing House in Beijing, 1993–1997,  (Volum 1), 7800219615 (Volum 2), 7800219631 (Volum 3), 7801370937 (Volum 4), and 7801370953 (Volum 5)

Battles of the Chinese Civil War
1949 in China
1950s in China
Campaigns to Suppress Bandits